Bertagna is a surname. Notable people with the surname include:

Bruno Bertagna (1935−2013), Italian Roman Catholic archbishop
Julie Bertagna (born 1962), Scottish writer
Silvia Bertagna (born 1986), Italian freestyle skier

See also
Bertogna